Davlin Mullen (born February 17, 1960) is a former American football defensive back. He played for the New York Jets from 1983 to 1986.

References

1960 births
Living people
American football defensive backs
Western Kentucky Hilltoppers football players
New York Jets players